The Dundee Hills AVA is an American Viticultural Area located in Yamhill County, Oregon. The Dundee Hills are a north-south oriented line of hills on the western side of the Willamette River valley. The soil is red in color, rich in iron, relatively infertile, making it suitable for grape cultivation. The Chehalem Mountains to the north protect the region from the cool breezes that enter Willamette Valley from the Columbia Gorge. Over 25 wineries and independent vineyards in this region produce over 44,000 cases of wine.

See also
Red Hills of Dundee

References

External links 
 The Dundee Hills AVA

American Viticultural Areas
Oregon wine
Geography of Yamhill County, Oregon
2004 establishments in Oregon